Steve Hanusch (born December 2, 1990) is a German professional ice hockey defenceman who currently plays for Dresdner Eislöwen of the DEL2. He previously played with Eisbären Berlin before joining Krefeld Pinguine on April 29, 2012. In the midst of the 2016–17 season, his 5th with the Pinguine, Hanusch left the club to sign in the DEL2 with the Kassel Huskies on December 13, 2016.

References

External links

1990 births
Living people
Dresdner Eislöwen players
Eisbären Berlin players
ETC Crimmitschau players
German ice hockey defencemen
Kassel Huskies players
Krefeld Pinguine players
EV Landshut players
Lausitzer Füchse players
Sportspeople from Cottbus